is a Japanese actress, voice actress and narrator affiliated with Aoni Production. Her best-known voice roles include Ophiuchus Shaina in Saint Seiya, Arale Norimaki in Dr. Slump, Minky Momo in Magical Princess Minky Momo, Lunch in Dragon Ball, Kaguya Ōtsutsuki in Naruto: Shippuden, Korosuke in Kiteretsu Daihyakka, Ryoko Mendo in Urusei Yatsura, and Charlotte Linlin (Big Mom) in One Piece, Vermouth in Detective Conan. Some of her notable roles in the 1990s and 2000s anime include Balalaika in Black Lagoon, Talia Gladys in Gundam Seed Destiny, Eva Heinemann in Monster, and Yōko Itoigawa in Hyōka. In feature films, she voiced Kei in Akira, and the adult Chiyoko Fujiwara in Millennium Actress.

Filmography

Anime

Feature films

Video games

Audio dramas

Overseas dubbing

Awards
 Anime Grand Prix: Most Popular Voice Actress of the Year (3): 1981, 1982, 1983

References

 Book References

External links
  
 Official agency profile 
 Mami Koyama at Hitoshi Doi's Seiyuu database
 
 
 

1955 births
Living people
People from Nishio, Aichi
Voice actresses from Aichi Prefecture
Japanese video game actresses
Japanese voice actresses
20th-century Japanese actresses
21st-century Japanese actresses
Aoni Production voice actors